"Anchors aweigh" is an idiom referring to the raising of a ship's anchor when starting a journey.

Anchors aweigh or Anchors Away may refer to:

Anchors Aweigh
"Anchors Aweigh", a song associated with the U.S. Navy
Anchors Aweigh (film), the 1945 movie starring Gene Kelly and Frank Sinatra
Anchors Aweigh (album), by the New Jersey punk band Bouncing Souls
"Anchors Aweigh", a lost episode of the British situation comedy The Likely Lads
"Anchors Aweigh", a 1989 song by the musical duo Wax
"Anchors Aweigh", a 1997 episode of The Wombles

Anchors Away
"Anchors Away" (SATC episode), an episode of Sex and the City
"Anchors Away" (Law & Order episode)